Lepidonectes corallicola, known commonly as the Galapagos triplefin blenny, is a species of triplefin blenny in the genus Lepidonectes. It was described by William Converse Kendall and Lewis Radcliffe in 1912. This species is endemic to the Galapagos Islands. It occurs on rocky slopes and harbour walls where the males hold territories in the breeding season, November to February. The male continues to court additional females while guarding the previous female's egg mass from predators.

References

External links
 

Galapagos triplefin
Taxa named by William Converse Kendall
Taxa named by Lewis Radcliffe
Fish described in 1912